Flavio Signore (Rome, Italy, 1970) is a producer, filmmaker, reporter, educator  and manager of international cooperation programs. He produces documentary films and news, coordinates projects for armed conflict victim relief based on art therapy and education.

Essential filmography 

 Syria: Rebellion, Revolution or a Holy War? (2012)  
 Libya Freedom Mia Mia (2011) 
 Georgia for Peace (2008)  
 Yunus: Economy for Peace (2007)
 Living under the Bombs (2006)  
 Buddha in Exile (2005) 
 The Dance of Shita (2004)

References

External links 
 
 Films
 Films on Amazon

Living people
Italian film producers
Italian documentary filmmakers
Film people from Rome
Year of birth missing (living people)